Stevensville is an unincorporated community in King and Queen County, Virginia, United States. The community is an agricultural community located along Virginia State Route 14 east of Bruington and St. Stephens Church. In 1864, Union Army colonel Ulric Dahlgren was killed during an assassination attempt against Confederate President Jefferson Davis and his cabinet near Stevensville at a junction known as Dahlgrens Corner since at least 1918. It is at the intersection of Virginia State Route 631 and Virginia State Route 632.

References

Unincorporated communities in Virginia
Unincorporated communities in King and Queen County, Virginia